John Raymond Wilton (2 May 1884 – 12 April 1944) was an Australian-born mathematician. In the period of 1926–1934 Wilton published 26 research papers on analysis and number theory. For which he gained the Doctorate in science from the University of Cambridge in 1930 and he was the first person to receive Thomas Ranken Lyle Medal in 1935 from the Australian National Research Council. On 12 April 1944, he died of a cerebral hemorrhage and was buried in West Terrace cemetery, Adelaide.

Education and scholarships 
At the University of Adelaide, Wilton graduated with first-class honors in mathematics and in physics (B.Sc). Professor Sir William Bragg praised Wilton for his natural genius in mathematics among any of his students. In 1904, Wilton proceeded to Trinity College, Cambridge for B.A., 1907 and M.A., 1911. He was awarded a sizarship and won Jeston scholarship in 1905. In 1914, he received his Doctor of Science from University of Adelaide.

Career 
In 1908, he joined as an assistant lecturer in the Cavendish Laboratory. Later, he worked as Lecturer in mathematics at the University of Sheffield from 1909 to 1919. In 1920, he returned to Australia and served as Professor of Mathematics at Adelaide University until his death in 1944. He was also a member of Edinburgh Mathematical Society since 1928.

Notable publications 
Wilton published 26 research papers during the period of 1926–1934. Some notable publications are
 On plane waves of sound (1913)
 On the highest wave in deep water (1913)
 On deep water waves (1914)
 Figures of equilibrium of rotating fluid under the restriction that the figure is to be a surface of revolution (1914)
 On the potential and force function of an electrified spherical bowl (1914–15)
 On ripples (1915) 
 On the solution of certain problems of two-dimensional physics (1915)
 A pseudo-sphere whose equation is expressible in terms of elliptic functions (1915)
 A formula in zonal harmonics (1916–17)

References 

1884 births
1944 deaths
20th-century Australian mathematicians